is the third studio album by the Japanese heavy metal band Loudness. It was released in 1983 only in Japan and later distributed in Europe by Roadrunner Records. The CD reissue of 2005 contains two extra songs coming from the English version of the band's third single.

Track listing
All music by Akira Takasaki except "Black Wall" by Masayoshi Yamashita. Lyrics by Minoru Niihara
Side one
"Theme of Loudness (part II)" - 1:52
"In the Mirror" - 3:41
"Show Me the Way" - 6:05
"I Wish You Were Here" - 3:45
"Mr. Yes Man" - 6:57

Side two
"The Law of Devil's Land" - 4:56
"Black Wall" - 5:06 
"Sleepless Night" - 4:48
"Speed" - 5:32

2005 Japanese CD edition bonus tracks
"Road Racer" - 4:25
"Shinkiro" (蜃気楼) - 4:01

Personnel
Loudness
Minoru Niihara - vocals
Akira Takasaki - guitars
Masayoshi Yamashita - bass 
Munetaka Higuchi - drums

Additional musicians
Eve - chorus on track 1

Production
Daiko Nagato, Mikio Shimizu - producers
Daniel McClendon - engineer, mixing
Akira Ohmachi - tape operator
Kenichi Kishi - label executive
Keisuke Tsukimitsu - art direction

References

1983 albums
Loudness (band) albums
Nippon Columbia albums
Japanese-language albums
Albums produced by Daiko Nagato